Pervomayka (Pervomaika) is a village in Astrakhan District of Akmola Region, Kazakhstan. It is located on the Ishim River.

Populated places in Akmola Region
Populated places established in 1936